Marsdenia cundurango is a species of plant of the genus Marsdenia with the common name condurango. It is native to Peru and Ecuador in South America.

Marsdenia cundurango is known to contain conduritol, a cyclitol or cyclic polyol. It was first isolated in 1908 by K. Kübler from the bark of the vine.

References

cundurango
Flora of South America